Tama Maru No. 6 (Japanese: 第六玉丸) was an auxiliary minesweeper of the Imperial Japanese Navy during World War II. She was later reclassified as a submarine chaser.

History
Tama Maru No. 6 was laid down on 1 March 1936 at the shipyard of Fujinagata Zosensho at the behest of shipping company, Taiyo Hogei. She was launched on 20 July 1936 and completed 1 September 1936. She was one of 8 ships built of her class (Tama Maru, Tama Maru No. 2, Tama Maru No. 3, Tama Maru No. 5, Tama Maru No. 6, Tama Maru No. 7, Tama Maru No. 8, Tama Maru No. 9 (later Nagato Maru)). On 11 April 1941, she was requisitioned by the Imperial Japanese Navy and converted to an auxiliary minesweeper under Reserve Lieutenant (Junior Grade) Nishida Hiroshi (西田祐志). Nishida served until 25 July 1943 when he was replaced by Reserve Lieutenant Ishii Hideo (石井英夫). On 10 May 1944, she was reclassified as a submarine chaser. She was removed from the navy list on 10 August 1944.

References

1936 ships
Ships built by Fujinagata Shipyards
Maritime incidents in August 1944
Ships sunk by American submarines
World War II minesweepers of Japan
Mine warfare vessels of the Imperial Japanese Navy
Auxiliary ships of the Imperial Japanese Navy